Alana Parnaby (born 15 September 1994) is an Australian tennis player.

Parnaby has a career-high doubles ranking by the Women's Tennis Association (WTA) of 201, achieved on 28 November 2022. She has won four doubles titles at tournaments of the ITF Women's Circuit.

Parnaby made her WTA Tour main-draw debut at the 2022 Sydney International in the doubles draw, where she partnered with Gabriella Da Silva-Fick.

Parnaby is studying a Bachelor of Sport Development at Deakin University.

ITF Circuit finals

Doubles: 11 (4 titles, 7 runner–ups)

References

External links
 
 
 

1994 births
Living people
Australian female tennis players
Tennis players from Melbourne
20th-century Australian women
21st-century Australian women